Batgereliin Möngöntuyaa (also Munguntuya Batgerel, ; born November 24, 1988 in Övörkhangai aimag) is a Mongolian sprinter, who specialized in the 400 metres. Batgerel represented Mongolia at the 2008 Summer Olympics, where she competed for the women's 400 metres. She ran in the sixth heat against seven other athletes, including Jamaica's Novlene Williams and Great Britain's Nicola Sanders, both of whom were heavy favorites in this event. She finished the race in last place by three seconds behind Albania's Klodiana Shala, with a time of 58.14. Batgerel, however, failed to advance into the semi-finals, as she placed forty-seventh overall, and was ranked below three mandatory slots for the next round.

References

External links
 

NBC Olympics Profile

Mongolian female sprinters
Living people
Olympic athletes of Mongolia
Athletes (track and field) at the 2008 Summer Olympics
1988 births
21st-century Mongolian women